Xanthorhoe is a genus of moths of the family Geometridae described by Jacob Hübner in 1825.

Selected species

 Xanthorhoe ablechra D. S. Fletcher, 1958
 Xanthorhoe abrasaria (Herrich-Schäffer, 1856)
 Xanthorhoe abyssinica Herbulot, 1983
 Xanthorhoe albodivisaria (Aurivillius, 1910)
 Xanthorhoe algidata (Möschler, 1874) (syn: Xanthorhoe dodata Cassino and Swett 1920)
 Xanthorhoe alluaudi (Prout, 1932)
 Xanthorhoe alta Debauche, 1937
 Xanthorhoe alticola (Aurivillius, 1925)
 Xanthorhoe alticolata Barnes & McDunnough, 1916
 Xanthorhoe altispex (L. B. Prout, 1921)
 Xanthorhoe anaspila Meyrick, 1891
 Xanthorhoe annotinata (Zetterstedt, 1839)
 Xanthorhoe ansorgei (Warren, 1899)
 Xanthorhoe argenteolineata (Aurivillius, 1910)
 Xanthorhoe baffinensis (Mcdunnough)
 Xanthorhoe barnsi (L. B. Prout, 1921)
 Xanthorhoe belgarum Herbulot, 1981
 Xanthorhoe biriviata (Borkhausen, 1794)
 Xanthorhoe borbonicata (Guenée, 1858)
 Xanthorhoe brachytoma Prout, 1933
 Xanthorhoe braunsi Janse, 1933
 Xanthorhoe bulbulata Guenée, 1868
 Xanthorhoe cadra (Debauche, 1937)
 Xanthorhoe callirrhoda D. S. Fletcher, 1958
 Xanthorhoe calycopsis Prout, 1933
 Xanthorhoe columelloides Barnes & McDunnough, 1913
 Xanthorhoe conchata Warren, 1898
 Xanthorhoe conchulata (L. B. Prout, 1921)
 Xanthorhoe consors (Prout, 1935)
 Xanthorhoe cuneosignata Debauche, 1937
 Xanthorhoe curcumata (Moore, 1888)
 Xanthorhoe cybele Prout, 1931
 Xanthorhoe decoloraria (Esper, 1806)
 Xanthorhoe defensaria (Guenée in Boisduval & Guenée, 1858)
 Xanthorhoe designata (Hufnagel, 1767)
 Xanthorhoe dissociata (Walker, 1863)
 Xanthorhoe eugraphata (de Joannis, 1915)
 Xanthorhoe euthytoma Prout, 1926
 Xanthorhoe excelsissima Herbulot, 1977
 Xanthorhoe exorista Prout, 1922
 Xanthorhoe ferrugata (Clerck, 1759)
 Xanthorhoe fluctuata (Linnaeus, 1758)
 Xanthorhoe fossaria Taylor, 1906
 Xanthorhoe frigida Howes, 1946
 Xanthorhoe heliopharia (C. Swinhoe, 1904)
 Xanthorhoe heteromorpha (Hampson, 1909)
 Xanthorhoe holophaea (Hampson, 1899)
 Xanthorhoe iduata (Guenée)
 Xanthorhoe incudina Herbulot, 1981
 Xanthorhoe incursata (Hübner, 1813)
 Xanthorhoe labradorensis (Packard)
 Xanthorhoe lacustrata (Guenée)
 Xanthorhoe latigrisea (Warren, 1897)
 Xanthorhoe latissima L. B. Prout, 1921
 Xanthorhoe lophogramma Meyrick, 1897
 Xanthorhoe magnata Herbulot, 1957
 Xanthorhoe malgassa Herbulot, 1954
 Xanthorhoe macdunnoughi Swett, 1918
 Xanthorhoe mediofascia (Wileman, 1915)
 Xanthorhoe melissaria (Guenée, 1858)
 Xanthorhoe mimica Janse, 1933
 Xanthorhoe mirabilata (Grote, 1883)
 Xanthorhoe molata Felder, 1875
 Xanthorhoe montanata (Denis & Schiffermüller, 1775)
 Xanthorhoe morosa Prout, 1933
 Xanthorhoe munitata (Hübner)
 Xanthorhoe oculata D. S. Fletcher, 1958
 Xanthorhoe orophyla (Meyrick, 1883)
 Xanthorhoe orophylloides Hudson, 1909
 Xanthorhoe oxybiata Millière, 1872
 Xanthorhoe peripleta (Brandt, 1941)
 Xanthorhoe phiara (L. B. Prout, 1921)
 Xanthorhoe phyxelia Prout, 1933
 Xanthorhoe pontiaria Taylor, 1906
 Xanthorhoe poseata (Geyer, 1837)
 Xanthorhoe procne (Fawcett, 1916)
 Xanthorhoe pseudognathus Herbulot, 1981
 Xanthorhoe quadrifasciata (Clerck, 1759)
 Xanthorhoe ramaria (Swett and Casino)
 Xanthorhoe rhodoides (Brandt, 1941)
 Xanthorhoe ruandana (Debauche, 1938)
 Xanthorhoe rudnicki Karisch & Hoppe, 2011
 Xanthorhoe rufivenata D. S. Fletcher, 1958
 Xanthorhoe saturata (Guenée, 1857)
 Xanthorhoe scarificata Prout, 1932
 Xanthorhoe semifissata Walker, 1862
 Xanthorhoe spadicearia (Denis & Schiffermüller, 1775)
 Xanthorhoe spatuluncis Wiltshire, 1982
 Xanthorhoe sublesta (Prout, 1932)
 Xanthorhoe submaculata (Warren, 1902)
 Xanthorhoe taiwana (Wileman, 1914)
 Xanthorhoe tamsi D. S. Fletcher, 1963
 Xanthorhoe transcissa (Warren, 1902)
 Xanthorhoe transjugata Prout, 1923
 Xanthorhoe trientata (Warren, 1901)
 Xanthorhoe tuta Herbulot, 1981
 Xanthorhoe vacillans Herbulot, 1954
 Xanthorhoe vana (Prout, 1926)
 Xanthorhoe vidanoi Parenzan & Hausmann, 1994
 Xanthorhoe wellsi (Prout, 1928)
 Xanthorhoe wiltshirei (Brandt, 1941)

External links
 "Xanthorhoe Hübner, 1825". Fauna Europaea. Retrieved May 15, 2019.
 

 
Geometridae genera
Taxa named by Jacob Hübner